Lahore Ke Rang Hari Ke Sang is an album of the Indian singer and Ghazal composer Hariharan, released on September 26, 2005. The album had 10 songs, all of them sung by Hariharan. This album had lot of expectations as Hariharan's last album came five years back.

Track listing

References

Hariharan (singer) albums
2005 albums